Haría is a village in the municipality of Haría in the north of the island of Lanzarote in the Canary Islands.  The town had a population of 1,128 in the 2011 census.  The town is the capital of the municipality of Haría.

It lies in a valley known as the Valley of 1,000 Palms.  A craft market is held in the town on Saturdays.

The artist César Manrique is buried in the cemetery of Haría.

References

External links 

Populated places in Lanzarote